IPDC may refer to:
 iPhone Developer Conference, the first iOS-Conference in Germany
 Instituto Profissional de Canossa, One of the college in Timor Leste by the  Canossa foundation 
 International Programme for the Development of Communication, a UNESCO program
 Internet Protocol Datacasting, which implies Internet Protocol based datacasting (data broadcasting) over radio and television broadcasting networks such as DVB-H
 Islamic Practice & Dawah Circle - IPDC.org.au
 Internet Protocol Device Control, a specification for controlling hardware devices